The Rose of the Flyer (German: Die Rose des Fliegers) is a 1919 German silent film directed by Kurt Rothe and starring Reinhold Schünzel.

Cast
 Will Korten-Kreswich
 Reinhold Schünzel
 Heinz Treskow
 Ortrud Wagner

References

Bibliography
 Bock, Hans-Michael & Bergfelder, Tim. The Concise CineGraph. Encyclopedia of German Cinema. Berghahn Books, 2009.

External links

1919 films
Films of the Weimar Republic
German silent feature films
Films directed by Kurt Rothe
German black-and-white films
1910s German films